Alexander White Brown (21 December 1877 – 6 March 1944) was a Scottish footballer.

Career
Brown was a prolific scorer in Scottish youth football, and earned his nickname as the "Glenbuck Goalgetter" as a 16-year-old playing for Glenbuck Athletic. Turning professional with St Bernard's two years later, he was soon induced across the border to English football with Preston North End. After three years, his career continued with Portsmouth, then Tottenham Hotspur.

During the 1900–01 season, Brown scored 15 goals during Tottenham's FA Cup run, including a goal in every round, which resulted in the club becoming the only non-League team to win the Cup. Brown scored both of Tottenham's goals in the first Final against Sheffield United, a 2–2 draw; in the replayed match he scored another as Spurs beat United 3–1 to win the Cup. In total, during his brief spell at Tottenham, Brown scored 64 goals in just 84 domestic games. He also played in the 1901–02 World Championship fixtures against Hearts, lining up alongside Sandy Tait who came from the same Ayrshire mining village, Glenbuck.

A spell back at Portsmouth and a time at Middlesbrough followed before Brown settled at Luton Town in 1905. After 33 goals in 69 league games, Brown left for Kettering Town before returning to Scotland with first Nithsdale Wanderers, then Ayr United.

Brown won one cap for Scotland, in a 1–0 defeat by England during the 1903–04 British Home Championship. He had been selected in 1902 against the same opposition and scored a goal, but that match in Glasgow was declared unofficial after a stand collapsed, killing dozens and injuring hundreds.

His younger brother Tommy was also a footballer and a forward, who also played for Glenbuck Athletic and Portsmouth, as well as Leicester Fosse, Chesterfield and Dundee.

Career statistics

International

Honours
Tottenham Hotspur
 FA Cup: 1900–01

References

External links 

1877 births
1944 deaths
Footballers from East Ayrshire
Scottish footballers
Scotland international footballers
English Football League players
Southern Football League players
Preston North End F.C. players
Portsmouth F.C. players
Tottenham Hotspur F.C. players
Luton Town F.C. players
Kettering Town F.C. players
Ayr United F.C. players
St Bernard's F.C. players
Association football forwards
Glenbuck Cherrypickers F.C. players
Scottish emigrants to New Zealand
Scottish Football League players
Middlesbrough F.C. players
FA Cup Final players